Hail Creek may refer to:

 Hail Creek, Queensland, a locality in the Isaac Region, Australia
 Hail Creek coal mine, a mine within that locality